The following lists events that happened in 1950 in Iceland.

Incumbents
President – Sveinn Björnsson
Prime Minister – Ólafur Thors, Steingrímur Steinþórsson

Events

Births

13 January – Valgerður Bjarnadóttir, politician.
23 March – Valgerður Sverrisdóttir, politician
16 June – Kristenn Einarsson, publisher
26 August – Steinunn Sigurðardóttir, poet and novelist
3 September – Jóhannes Eðvaldsson, footballer (d. 2021)
4 September – Tómas Pálsson, footballer
19 October – Guðrún Ögmundsdóttir, politician (d. 2019)
4 November – Jón Pétursson, footballer

Deaths
25 April – Guðjón Samúelsson, architect (b. 1887)

References

 
1950s in Iceland
Iceland
Iceland
Years of the 20th century in Iceland